Vila Real Quelimane, usually known simply as Vila Real Quelimane, is a traditional football (soccer) club based in Quelimane, Mozambique.

Stadium
The club plays their home matches at Vila de Stadium, which has a maximum capacity of 10,000 people.

Current squad

References

Quelimane
Football clubs in Mozambique